William Reginald Gardiner (27 February 1903 – 7 July 1980) was an English actor on the stage, in films and on television.

Early years
Gardiner was born in Wimbledon, England, and he was a graduate of the Royal Academy of Dramatic Art. His parents wanted him to be an architect, but he insisted on a career as an actor.

Stage and radio
Gardiner started as a super on stage and eventually became well known on the West End stage. "He appeared in British revues, plays and films before delighting Broadway audiences in 1935 with a wallpaper imitation act in At Home Abroad." His other Broadway credits include Little Glass Clock and An Evening with Beatrice Lillie.

He was also well known to radio listeners, and was known on the air for his amusing train and car noises.

Film
Gardiner worked in almost 100 movies. He started film work in crowd scenes, making his big film break in 1927 the silent film The Lodger, by Alfred Hitchcock.

[[File:Dictator charlie-10.jpg|thumb|Gardiner and Charlie Chaplin in The Great Dictator (1940)]]

His Hollywood film debut came in 1936. During his career he was cast in numerous roles, often as a British butler. One of his most famous roles was that of Schultz in Charlie Chaplin's The Great Dictator. He also performed memorable turns as Beverly Carlton (a parody of Noël Coward) in  The Man Who Came to Dinner, the spurned "almost-husband" in The Doctor Takes a Wife, Christmas in Connecticut and – one of his most memorable roles – in the Laurel and Hardy epic The Flying Deuces.

Television
On 4 October 1956 Gardiner appeared with Greer Garson as the first two guest stars in the series premiere of NBC's The Ford Show, Starring Tennessee Ernie Ford. In 1956 he was the guest star on The Millionaire in the episode "The Story of Waldo Francis Turner". Also in 1956 he starred as the title character in a pilot for "Mr. Belvedere", nearly thirty years before the more successful Mr. Belvedere made its debut.

He made other guest appearances on television sitcoms of the 1960s, including Fess Parker's ABC series, Mr. Smith Goes to Washington and Stanley Holloway's Our Man Higgins. He appeared in the 1964 Perry Mason episode "The Case of the Ugly Duckling", as business owner Albert Charity, and in an episode of Alfred Hitchcock Presents ("Banquo's Chair"). In 1966, he was featured on Green Acres as orchestra conductor Sir Geoffrey in the first-season episode "Culture". His last major role was alongside Phyllis Diller in her 1966–1967 ABC series The Pruitts of Southampton.  Also in 1967 he made a guest appearance on Petticoat Junction, in the episode "Uncle Joe and the Master Plan", as Gaylord Martindale.
He played role of Mr. Maudlin in season 6, episode 19, "Dead as a Dude" of 77 Sunset Strip.

Recordings
Gardiner recorded a curious and eccentric classic called "Trains", which was regularly played on the 1950s British radio programme Children's Favourites. This record consisted of a tipsy-sounding Gardiner reciting a monologue, which he first introduced in the 1935 Broadway revue At Home Abroad, about steam railway engines (which he claimed were 'livid beasts') and impersonating both the engines themselves and the sound of trains running on the track. This latter he famously characterised as 'diddly-dee, diddly-dum' to mimic the sound pattern as the four pairs of bogie wheels ran over joins between the lengths of track – a sound no longer heard since welded rail joins were introduced. "Trains" was released as a 78 and a 45 by English Decca Records (F 5278) which remained on catalogue into the 1970s. At the end of the record Gardiner signs off with "Well folks, that's all: back to the asylum." He was summoned to Buckingham Palace to give a performance in person.

Personal life
Gardiner was married twice. He first married Wyn Richmond, a British actress, but they divorced. Later he married model Nadia Petrova.

Gardiner had a son out of wedlock with Jane Bagnato in Toronto, Canada: Reginald James "Jamie" Gardiner was born January 1, 1939. He left Jane and his son after three years to marry Nadia. Jamie's last name was changed to Williams at age 8, after his mother married Reginald Williams in 1947.

Death
Gardiner died of a heart attack at his home in Westwood, California, on 7 July 1980. He was survived by his wife.

Filmography

 The Lodger (1927) - Dancer at Ball (uncredited)
 The Perfect Lady (1931) - Lord Tony Carderay
 Josser on the River (1932) - Donald
 Leave It to Smith (1933) - Lord Redwood
 Radio Parade (1933) - Himself
 The Diplomatic Lover (1934) - Dersingham
 Virginia's Husband (1934) - John Craddock
 Borrow a Million (1934) - Alastair Cartwright
 A Little Bit of Bluff (1935) - Hugh Rigby
 Royal Cavalcade (1935) - Bus Conductor
 Opening Night (1935)
 Born to Dance (1936) - Policeman
 A Damsel in Distress (1937) - Keggs
 Everybody Sing (1938) - Jerrold Hope
 Marie Antoinette (1938) - Comte d'Artois
 Sweethearts (1938) - Norman Trumpett
 The Girl Downstairs (1938) - Willie
 The Flying Deuces (1939) - François
 The Night of Nights (1939) - J. Neville Prime
 The Doctor Takes a Wife (1940) - John Pierce
 Dulcy (1940) - Schuyler Van Dyke
 The Great Dictator (1940) - Commander Schultz
 My Life with Caroline (1941) - Paul
 A Yank in the R.A.F. (1941) - Roger Pillby
 Sundown (1941) - Lt. Rodney 'Roddy' Turner
 The Man Who Came to Dinner (1942) - Beverly Carlton
 Captains of the Clouds (1942) - Scrounger Harris
 Immortal Sergeant (1943) - Tom Benedict
 Forever and a Day (1943) - Assistant Hotel Manager
 Claudia (1943) - Jerry Seymour
 Sweet Rosie O'Grady (1943) - Charles, Duke of Trippingham
 The Horn Blows at Midnight (1945) - Composer / Archibald 'Archie' Dexter
 Molly and Me (1945) - Harry Phillips / Peabody, the Butler
 Christmas in Connecticut (1945) - John Sloan
 The Dolly Sisters (1945) - Tony, Duke of Breck
 Do You Love Me (1946) - Herbert Benham
 One More Tomorrow (1946) - James 'Jim' Aloysius Fisk
 Cluny Brown (1946) - Hilary Ames
 I Wonder Who's Kissing Her Now (1947) - Will Hough
 Fury at Furnace Creek (1948) - Capt. Grover A. Walsh
 That Lady in Ermine (1948) - Alberto
 That Wonderful Urge (1948) - Count André de Guyon
 Wabash Avenue (1950) - English Eddie
 I'll Get By (1950) - Himself (uncredited)
 Halls of Montezuma (1951) - Sgt. Johnson
 Elopement (1951) - Roger Evans
 Androcles and the Lion (1952) - Lentulus
 Black Widow (1954) - Brian Mullen
 Ain't Misbehavin' (1955) - Anatole Piermont Rogers
 The Birds and the Bees (1956) - Gerald
 The Story of Mankind (1957) - William Shakespeare
 Rock-A-Bye Baby (1958) - Harold Hermann
 Back Street (1961) - Dalian
 Mr. Hobbs Takes a Vacation (1962) - Reggie McHugh
 What a Way to Go! (1964) - Painter
 Sergeant Deadhead (1965) - Lt. Comm. Talbott
 Do Not Disturb (1965) - Simmons

Selected stage credits
 Chance Acquaintance by John Van Druten (1927)
 A Present from Margate'' by Ian Hay (1933)

Radio appearances

References

External links

1903 births
1980 deaths
English male stage actors
English male radio actors
English male film actors
English male television actors
20th-century English male actors
Burials at Forest Lawn Memorial Park (Hollywood Hills)
20th-century American male actors
Alumni of RADA
British expatriate male actors in the United States
People from Westwood, Los Angeles